Hollybush is an unincorporated community within Knott County, Kentucky, United States.

References

Unincorporated communities in Knott County, Kentucky
Unincorporated communities in Kentucky